Robert Arden (11 December 1922 – 25 March 2004) was an English film, television and radio actor born in London who worked and lived mostly in the United Kingdom.

Early years
Arden was born from an American father and an English mother. His father had a successful career as a professional boxer after World War I. He attended "a combination of English and American schools."

Career
Arden's most famous film appearance was as lead character Guy Van Stratten in Mr. Arkadin (1955), written and directed by Orson Welles. Welles had worked with Arden on the Harry Lime radio series, produced in London, and had also appreciated his performance in a London production of Guys and Dolls. He later cast the little-known actor in Mr. Arkadin, in the central role of the investigator who uncovers Arkadin's past. Reportedly, Arden was shocked that Welles might consider him for the part and initially thought that the director's phone inquiry was a crank call.<ref>[http://www.filmthreat.com/features/1401/ The Bootleg files : Mr. Arkadin'], filmthreat.com</ref>

Arden's performance in Mr. Arkadin was panned by some critics : The New York Times called it "hopelessly inadequate". Film historian Jonathan Rosenbaum has defended Arden's performance, locating the problem not in the actor's work but in "the unsavoriness and obnoxiousness of the character", who was intended by Welles to be unattractive even though he occupied in the film "the space normally reserved for charismatic heroes".

The credits of one of the film's Spanish versions misspelled Arden's name as "Bob Harden".  Another Spanish print actually credited him as "Mark Sharpe".Mr. Arkadin did poorly at the box-office (but later received a cult following and all versions were part of a Criterion Collection box set). Afterwards, Arden played a few other lead roles, in films such as The Depraved (1957) or The Child and the Killer (1959), but he worked mostly as a character actor, appearing in film, television and stage productions, perhaps most memorably as a high official who is hypnotized to take his own life by the adult Damien Thorne (played by Sam Neill) in The Omen III: The Final Conflict.

Selected filmographyTwo Thousand Women (1944) - Dave KennedyThe Man from Morocco (1945) - American Sergeant A Matter of Life and Death (1946) - GI playing Tom Snout (uncredited)The Hills of Donegal (1947) - DanielMr. Arkadin (1955) - Guy Van StrattenJoe MacBeth (1955) - RossSoho Incident (1956) - BuddyBermuda Affair (1956) - BillThe Counterfeit Plan (1957) - Bob FentonA King in New York (1957) - LiftboyThe Depraved (1957) - Dave DillonThe Child and the Killer (1959) - JoeNever Take Sweets from a Stranger (1960) - Tom DemarestCall Me Bwana (1963) - 1st C.I.A. ManDeath Drums Along the River (1963) - Jim HunterOmen III: The Final Conflict (1981) - American AmbassadorCondorman (1981) - CIA ChiefRagtime (1981) - Foreman of the JuryThe Story of Ruth (1981) - FatherD.A.R.Y.L. (1985) - ColonelAmong Wolves (1985) - Le général Lee W. SimonLittle Shop of Horrors (1986) - Network Exec #1Strong Medicine (1986) - Dr. PotterWhoops Apocalypse'' (1988) - White House Reporter

References

External links

1922 births
2004 deaths
20th-century English male actors
21st-century English male actors
Male actors from London
Male actors of American descent
English male film actors
English male television actors
English people of American descent